Hyposmocoma waihohonu is a species of moth of the family Cosmopterigidae. It is endemic to Maui. The species belongs to the amphibious caterpillar guild of the genus Hyposmocoma.

References

waihohonu
Endemic moths of Hawaii
Moths described in 2011